WNAK (W-NAK) may refer to:

 WGMF (AM), radio station 730 AM in Nanticoke, Pennsylvania, USA; formerly WNAK-AM prior to 2010
 WTRW, radio station 95.3 FM in  Carbondale, Pennsylvania, USA; formerly WNAK-FM (2004-2006)

See also

 Nak (disambiguation)
 KNAK (disambiguation), callsign K-NAK